ERSP may refer to:

 Estonian National Independence Party (Eesti Rahvusliku Sõltumatuse Partei)
 Estonian Radical Socialist Party (Eesti Radikaalsotsialistlik Partei)
 Evangelical Review of Society and Politics
 Electronic retailing self-regulation program